Cyartonematidae is a family of nematodes belonging to the order Desmoscolecida.

Genera:
 Cyartonema Cobb, 1920
 Cyartonemoides Thanh & Gagarin, 2011
 Paraterschellingia Kreis, 1935

References

Nematodes